Kartabya is a 2003 Indian Bengali-language drama film directed by Swapan Saha and produced by Pijush Saha and Subrata Saha Roy. It is a remake of the 2001 Tamil-language film Samudhiram.

Cast
 Prosenjit Chatterjee
 Rachna Banerjee
 Lokesh Ghosh
 Dulal Lahiri
 Locket Chatterjee
 Tapas Paul
 Abhishek Chatterjee
 Moumita Chakraborty
 Kalyani Mondal
 Badsha Maitra
 Manjushree Ganguly

Music
Ashok Bhadra composed the soundtrack album to the film, which includes songs rendered by Annupamaa, Soham Chakraborty, Shreya Ghoshal, Kumar Sanu and Babul Supriyo. The lyrics were written by Gautam Susmit.

Release
Kartabya was released on 26 November 2003.

References

2000s Bengali-language films
Bengali remakes of Tamil films
Bengali-language Indian films
Indian drama films